Sven Kivisildnik (citizen name Sven Sildnik; born in 1963 in Rakvere) is an Estonian writer, journalist and politician.

He has studied journalism at University of Tartu. He is a member of two literary groups: Hirohall and Estonian Kostabi-$ociety.

He is managing the publishing house Jumalikud Ilmutused.

At the general meeting of the Estonian Independence Party (EIB) held on 18 April 2015, he was elected chairman of the party. From 2009 until 2015, he was the Estonian Independence Party Vice Chairman, and from 2006 until 2009, the Estonian Independence Party Secretary General.

He ran for the Estonian Conservative People's Party for the Pärnu City Council and was elected.

 

Awards:
 2007: annual poetry award of the Estonian Cultural Endowment

Works
 

 "Märg Viktor" (1989)
 "Dawa vita" (1991)
 "Nagu härjale punane kärbseseen" (1996)
 "Loomade peal katsetatud inimene" (1997)
 "Kutse" (1997)
 "Päike, mida sa õhtul teed" (2003)
 "Rahvuseepos Kalevipoeg ehk Armastus" (2003)
 "Null tolerants" (2004)
 "Otsin naist: koledatel, vaestel, vanadel ja kiimalistel mitte tülitada" (2004)
 "Poeem Puutinile" (2004)
 "Valitud teosed I, jutustused ja romaanid 1984–2004" (2004)
 "Vägistatud jäämägi" (2006)

References

Living people
1963 births

20th-century Estonian writers
21st-century Estonian writers
Estonian male poets
Estonian male short story writers
Estonian journalists
Estonian Independence Party politicians
University of Tartu alumni
People from Rakvere